Events from the year 1588 in the Kingdom of Scotland.

Incumbents
Monarch – James VI

Events
 6 February – General Assembly of the Church of Scotland called to defend against the Spanish Armada.
 12 August – the fleeing Spanish Armada sails past the Firth of Forth, and the English call off their pursuit. Much of the Spanish fleet is destroyed by storms as it sails for home around Scotland and Ireland. On 27 September, El Gran Grifón is wrecked on Fair Isle; and on 5 November the San Juan de Silicia is said to have been destroyed by explosion having sought shelter off Tobermory, Mull.
 date unknown – Hamilton Academy founded as a grammar school in Lanarkshire (closed 1972).

Births
 15 May – John Moore, planter in Ulster (died 1648 in Ireland)
David Forrester, divine (died 1633)

Deaths
Between 1 April & 5 November – George Gordon, bishop of Galloway
 16 July – Agnes Keith, Countess of Moray (born c.1540)
 4 August – Archibald Douglas, 8th Earl of Angus (born 1555)
 4 November – Robert Mor Munro, 15th Baron of Foulis

See also
 Timeline of Scottish history

References

 
Years of the 16th century in Scotland